Rubén Maximiliano Alexander Rábago (born 6 October 1977) is a Mexican lawyer and politician. As of 2014 he served as Deputy of the LIX Legislature of the Mexican Congress representing the State of Mexico.

References

1977 births
Living people
Politicians from Mexico City
21st-century Mexican lawyers
National Action Party (Mexico) politicians
Members of the Congress of the State of Mexico
20th-century Mexican politicians
21st-century Mexican politicians
Deputies of the LIX Legislature of Mexico
Members of the Chamber of Deputies (Mexico) for the State of Mexico